Dialommus fuscus, the Galápagos four-eyed blenny, is a species of labrisomid blenny endemic to the coasts of the Galapagos Islands. It inhabits the intertidal zone where it lives in tide pools as well as traveling on land.

References

fuscus
Fish described in 1891